The 1986 Detroit Lions season was their 57th in the league. The team failed to improve upon their previous season's output of 7–9 and missed the playoffs for the third straight season with a 5–11 record. The highlight of the season was first round draft choice Chuck Long’s first pass for a TD against Tampa Bay. Long would start in a Monday Night game against the Chicago Bears.

Offseason

NFL Draft

Roster

Schedule

Season summary

Week 1 at Vikings

Week 6 

 Source: Pro-Football-Reference.com

Standings

References 

Detroit Lions seasons
Detroit Lions
Detroit Lions